General elections were held in Vanuatu on 2 May 2002. The result was a victory for the Union of Moderate Parties, which won 15 of the 52 seats. After the elections, the Parliament re-elected VP leader Edward Natapei as Prime Minister.

Results

See also
List of members of the Parliament of Vanuatu (2002–2004)

References
 

2002 in Vanuatu
Vanuatu
Elections in Vanuatu
May 2002 events in Oceania